Politics of Cardiff refers to the political representation of the city of Cardiff, capital of Wales. Cardiff is represented politically at a local, Wales and United Kingdom level and previously at the European level.

Political representation 
Cardiff is covered by four parliamentary constituencies which form the electoral basis for elections to the Parliament of the United Kingdom and the Senedd (Welsh Parliament).

The constituencies and their current representatives in the House of Commons are:
 Cardiff Central: Jo Stevens (Labour Party)
 Cardiff North: Anna McMorrin (Labour Party)
 Cardiff South and Penarth: Stephen Doughty (Labour Party)
 Cardiff West: Kevin Brennan (Labour Party)

Famous politicians who have represented Cardiff constituencies include James Callaghan, a former Prime Minister who held his constituency seat for over forty years. Rhodri Morgan a former First Minister, was previously MP for Cardiff West, as had George Thomas, 1st Viscount Tonypandy, who served as Speaker of the House of Commons between 1976 and 1983.

Senedd 

The Senedd (Welsh Parliament; ; formerly known as the National Assembly for Wales) has been based in Cardiff Bay since its formation in 1999. The building which is now known as the Senedd building was opened on 1 March 2006, by the Queen. The executive and civil servants of the Welsh Government are based in Cardiff's Cathays Park while the Members of the Senedd, the Senedd Parliamentary Service and Ministerial support staff are based in Cardiff Bay. Cardiff elects four constituency Members of the Senedd (MSs) to the Welsh Parliament, with the individual constituencies for the Welsh Parliament being the same as for the UK Parliament. All of the city's residents have an extra vote for the South Wales Central region which increases proportionality to the Welsh Parliament. The most recent Welsh Parliament elections were held on 3 May 2016.

As with the United Kingdom Parliament, Cardiff is split into four constituencies:
 Cardiff Central: Jenny Rathbone (Labour)
 Cardiff North: Julie Morgan (Labour)
 Cardiff South and Penarth: Vaughan Gething (Labour)
 Cardiff West: Mark Drakeford (Labour)

The South Wales Central Senedd region elects four Members of the Senedd to serve the area covered by Cardiff, Rhondda-Cynon-Taf and the Vale of Glamorgan local authority areas. These are currently:
 Joel James (Conservative)
 Andrew R. T. Davies (Conservative)
 Rhys ab Owen (Plaid Cymru)
 Heledd Fychan (Plaid Cymru)

Local government 

Cardiff had an elected town council from 1836. In 1889 Cardiff became a county borough, represented by 40 elected councillors and aldermen on Cardiff County Borough Council (commonly referred to as Cardiff City Council after the town gained city status in 1905). Representation increased to 52 after 1922.

Between 1974 and 1996 the council became a second tier district council of South Glamorgan. Cardiff voters also elected councillors to South Glamorgan County Council.

Since local government reorganisation in 1996, Cardiff has been governed by the City and County Council of Cardiff, which is based at County Hall in Atlantic Wharf, Cardiff Bay. Voters elect 75 councillors every four years, with the next elections due to be held in 2016.

The council was run by a Labour majority administration between 1995 and 2004. The Liberal Democrats ran a minority administration from 2004-2008. In 2012 Labour regained control of the council.

As of 2019, Labour have 38 councillors, the Liberal Democrats have 11, the Conservatives have 21, Cardiff West Independents have 4, with 1 from Heath & Birchgrove Independents. The Leader of the Council, Cllr Huw Thomas, is from the Labour Party.

Community Councils

There are currently six community Councils in Cardiff:

Lisvane (10 seats)
Old St. Mellons (9 seats)
Pentyrch (13 seats)
Radyr & Morganstown (13 seats)
Tongwynlais (9 seats)
St. Fagans (9 seats)

Elections are held every five years. The last contested elections would have been held in May 2017, had there been more candidates than available seats. For example, only six candidates stood in St Fagans for nine seats, whilst in Radyr & Morganstown eight candidates stood for thirteen seats.
In Pentyrch, ten candidates (6 Ind, 3 Lab, 1 Plaid Cymru) put themselves forward for thirteen seats, so all were elected unopposed.
 
Community Councils have the ability to co-opt new Councillors between elections to fill vacancies if not enough candidates stand for election. Alternatively, a By-election will be called if ten or more registered electors within the relevant ward call for one after a Notice of Casual Vacancy is published.

In March 2020, there were twelve Co-opted Community Councillors in Cardiff (3 on Lisvane, 4 on Pentyrch, 3 on St Fagans, 1 on Tongwynlais and 1 on Radyr & Morganstown) as well as three vacant seats (2 on Old St Mellons and 1 on Pentyrch) on the six Council websites.

See also
 List of mayors of Cardiff

References

Politics of Cardiff
Politics of Wales